Wadi Dhaba is a sub-district located in Dhi al-Sufal District, Ibb Governorate, Yemen. Wadi Dhaba had a population of 26028 as of 2004.

References 

Sub-districts in Dhi As Sufal District